The Duroc pig is an older breed of domestic pig. The breed was developed in the United States and formed the basis for many mixed-breed commercial hogs. Duroc pigs are reddish-brown and golden yellow, large-framed, medium length, and muscular, with partially-drooping ears. They tend to be one of the least aggressive of all swine breeds raised for meat.

Origins and history
The breed, one of several red pig strains which developed around 1800 in New England, originated in Africa. One theory is that the pigs were imported from the Guinea coast of Africa at the time of the slave trade. Another suggestion is that the red color came from the Berkshire pig from Britain, a breed that is now black, but at that time was rusty brown. Another influence on the breed may have been four shoats from Spain and Portugal that were imported around 1837, but it is unclear whether these formed part of the breed's ancestry.

The breed is said to have been named for a stallion belonging to Harry Kelsey in New York state (1820s) or that "the breed was named after a race horse and he in turn was named after Napoleon's Aide, Gen. Christoph Duroc. . . ."

The modern Duroc originated circa 1850 from crosses of the Jersey Red and New York's older Duroc. The breed started being used in shows around the 1950s. Durocs are predominantly kept for their meat, and are appreciated for their hardiness and quick but thorough muscle growth.

The first pig to have its genome sequenced was a female Duroc named T.J. Tabasco.

Characteristics
Originally, the Duroc was a very large pig, but not as large as was the Jersey Red. Today, it is a medium-sized breed with a moderately long body and a slightly dished face. The ears are drooping and not held erect. The color is often an orangish-brown, but ranges from a light-golden shade to a deep mahogany-red. The weight of a mature boar is about 882 pounds, and the sow is about 772 pounds.

References

External links
 Duroc profile and eligibility requirements for the National Swine Registry

Pig breeds originating in the United States